World Series Wrestling is an Australian professional wrestling promotion. Originally founded in 2005, the promotion was in business for two years before going on hiatus, resuming operations in 2017. The company is founded, promoted and owned by Adrian Manera.

History
The first tour in 2005, titled International Assault, visited three cities - Melbourne, Sydney and Newcastle - in early October. In Melbourne the first WSW heavyweight champion was crowned in a one-off match between Rhino and Jeff Jarrett, with Rhino gaining the victory. Also on the same night the first of a three match series was contested between A.J. Styles and Christopher Daniels with Styles winning a 30-minute iron man match 1 fall to none. Rhino successfully defended his title against Jarrett in Sydney while Daniels leveled the three match series in Sydney, but on the final night of the tour Jarrett defeated Rhino in Newcastle while Styles won the three match series. The 2005 International Assault Tour also featured the final wrestling matches of ex WWE star, Australia's Nathan Jones.

The second tour in 2007 was also titled International Assault and took place in early June - again visiting the same three cities. The WSW heavyweight title was vacant and another one-off match in Sydney was held to fill the vacancy. Bryan Danielson defeated Nigel McGuinness for the title in a match for the ages. Local Sydney promotion the Australasian Wrestling Federation allowed its Australasian title and tag team titles to be defended on the show, with then AWF champion TNT defending successfully against Billy Kidman. In Melbourne, Danielson successfully defended his title against McGuinness, but in Newcastle Danielson lost the title to Kidman in an amazing match the first and last time the two competed in a singles match. . The tour also featured Kid Kash and the Australian debut of Austin Aries.

Following on from International Assault 2, the next tour which took place in August 2007, entitled Global Attack rocked a near sell out crowd in Adelaide's Thebarton Theatre which featured Billy Kidman successfully defending the Heavyweight Championship against Heidenreich, and the Australian return of Kid Kash as well as the Australian debut of Masato Tanaka.

After a hiatus from promoting live events, World Series Wrestling planned to return with 3 live events planned for 2010 in Adelaide, Melbourne and Sydney. The tour was to feature Balls Mahoney, Tommy Dreamer, Daivari, Petey Williams, Heidenreich, Tajiri, Sonjay Dutt and more. Unfortunately as a result of the main sponsor pulling out only weeks prior to the tour, World Series Wrestling was left with no alternative but to cancel the planned event. WSW returned in November 2017 after a 10-year hiatus. Their first tour featured top independent wrestlers Ricochet, Austin Aries, Zack Sabre Jr., Tessa Blanchard, Joey Ryan and Brian Cage. On 25 November, Ricochet defeated Aries to become the new WSW Heavyweight Champion after the title had been vacant since mid-2007. During the following months, the promotion hosted more tours in Australia. On 17 March, The Young Bucks became the inaugural WSW Tag Team champions. On 10 March, Jordynne Grace defeat Kellyanne and Shazza McKenzie in a triple threat match to be crowned the inaugural WSW Women's Champion.

Current champions

WSW World Heavyweight Championship
The WSW World Heavyweight Championship is a professional wrestling championship contested for in the heavyweight division of World Series Wrestling.
{| class="wikitable sortable" style="text-align:center;"
|-
!Rank
!style="width: 13%;"|Wrestler
!Reign
!Date
!Days held
!Location
!Event
!Notes
!Ref.
|-
!
|Rhino
|
|
|
|Melbourne, Victoria
|International Incident – Day 1
|align="left"|Defeated Jeff Jarrett to become inaugural champion 
|
|-
!
|Jeff Jarrett
|
|
|
|Newcastle, New South Wales
|International Incident – Day 3
|
|
|- style="background:#e3e3e3"
|
|
|
|
|
|
|
|align="left"|WSW stripped Jeff Jarrett of the title due to his commitments with Total Nonstop Action
|
|-
!
|Bryan Danielson
|
|
|
|Kensington, New South Wales
|International Assault – Day 1
|align="left"|Defeated Nigel McGuinness to win the vacant title
|
|-
!
|Billy Kidman
|
|
|
|Newcastle, New South Wales
|International Assault – Day 3
|
|
|- style="background:#e3e3e3"
|
|
|
|
|
|
|
|align="left"|Title belt became inactive after WSW hiatus
|
|-
!
|Ricochet
|
|
|
|Adelaide, South Australia
|International Assault Tour 2K17 – Day 2
|align="left"|Defeated Austin Aries and Brian Cage in a triple threat match to win the vacant title
|
|-
!
|Austin Aries
|
|
|
|Penrith, New South Wales
|International Assault Tour 2K17 – Day 4
|
|
|-
!
|Brian Cage
|
|
|
|Melbourne, Australia
|International Assault Best Of The Best – Day 1
|align="left"|Defeated Austin Aries and Johnny Impact in a triple threat match
|
|-
!
|Johnny Impact
|
|
|
|Melbourne, Australia
|International Assault Best Of The Best – Day 2
|
|
|-
!9
|Austin Aries
|2
|
|
|Adelaide, South Australia
|International Assault Best Of The Best – Day 3
|
|
|-
!10
|Robbie Eagles
|1
|
|
|Penrith, New South Wales
|International Assault The Elite Takeover - Day 4
|
|
|-
!11
|Marty Scurll
|1
|
|1
|Ferntree Gully, Victoria
|WSW International Assault Zero Fear - Day 2 
|
|
|-

|-
!12
|Johnny Downunder
|2
|
|
|Adelaide, South Australia
|Phoenix Rising, Day 1
|align="left"|Defeated Joey Janela to win the vacant title. Downunder was previously known as Johnny Impact.
|   
|-
!13
|Matt Cardona
|1
|
|+
|Melbourne, Victoria
|Unleash Hell, Day 2
|align="left"|
|

Combined reigns 

{|class="wikitable sortable" style="text-align: center"
!Rank
!Wrestler
!No. ofreigns
!Combineddays
|-
!1
|Jeff Jarrett || 1 || 570
|-
!2
|Austin Aries || 2 || 363
|-
!3
|Johnny Impact/Downunder || 2 ||247
|-
!4
|Robbie Eagles  || 1 || 208
|-
!5
|Billy Kidman || 1 || 89
|-
!6
|style="background-color:#FFE6BD"|Matt Cardona † || 1 ||+
|-
!7
|Rhino || 1 || 3
|-
!rowspan=2|8
|Bryan Danielson || 1 || 2
|-
|Ricochet || 1 || 2
|-
!rowspan=2|10
|Brian Cage || 1 || 1 
|-
|Marty Scurll || 1 || 1
|-

WSW Tag Team Championship
The WSW Tag Team Championship is a professional wrestling championship contested for in the tag team division of World Series Wrestling.

WSW Women's Championship 
The WSW Women's Championship is a professional wrestling championship contested for in the women's division of World Series Wrestling.

See also

 Professional wrestling in Australia
 List of professional wrestling organisations in Australia

References

External links 

 

Australian professional wrestling promotions
Companies established in 2005
Professional wrestling in Australia
Entertainment companies established in 2005
Australian companies established in 2005